Sar Asiab (also Romanized as Sar Asīyāb, Sar Āsīāb, and Sar Aseyāb) is a village in Gurani Rural District, Gahvareh District, Dalahu County, Kermanshah Province, Iran. At the 2006 census, its population was 31, in 8 families.

References 

Populated places in Dalahu County